Replicant is a type of bioengineered android from the 1982 science fiction film Blade Runner.

Replicant may refer to:

Arts and entertainment
Replicant (film), 2001 film by Ringo Lam.
"The Replicants" (episode), a 2017 TV episode of Ancient Aliens, see List of Ancient Aliens episodes
Nier (video game), which had releases with subtitles of Replicant and Gestalt. The game has bioengineered humans similar to replicants in Blade Runner.
"Replicants", an artwork by Roxy Paine
Replicant (DC Comics), a DC Comics character associated with Sideways (comics)

Music
Replicants (band), American rock band.
 Replicants (album), 1995 album by the eponymous band
Alexandre Azaria (also known by the alias Replicant), a French composer, guitarist and film soundtrack writer. 

Songs
"Replicant" (song), a 2019 song by Delta Heavy off the album Only in Dreams (Delta Heavy album)
"Replicants" (song), 2010 song by Ash
"Replicant" (song), a 2009 song by Deux Ex Machina off the album I, Human
"The Replicant" (song), a 1992 song by Covenant (band)

Fictional music topics
"The Replicants", backing band for singer Priss, a fictional character from Bubblegum Crisis fictional universe

Other uses
 Replicant, Desktop Widgets found in the Haiku operating system.
Replicant (operating system), a fully free Android-like distribution.

See also

 Replikants, a sideproject of American band Unwound
 Replicante, a Mexican magazine